Rennsteig is a former Verwaltungsgemeinschaft ("collective municipality") in the district Ilm-Kreis, in Thuringia, Germany. The seat of the Verwaltungsgemeinschaft was in Schmiedefeld am Rennsteig. It was disbanded in January 2019.

The Verwaltungsgemeinschaft Rennsteig consisted of the following municipalities:

Frauenwald
Schmiedefeld am Rennsteig
Stützerbach

References

Former Verwaltungsgemeinschaften in Thuringia